Anmol Gagan Maan is an Indian politician minister of Punjab government and Punjabi singer. She is the MLA representing the Kharar Assembly constituency in the Punjab Legislative Assembly. She is a member of the Aam Aadmi Party. She was elected as the MLA in the 2022 Punjab Legislative Assembly election. Anmol Gagan Maan is also known as Gagandeep Kaur Maan. She is a Punjabi singer known for her Punjabi folk and Bhangra songs.

Political career
Maan is a member of the Aam Aadmi Party. She joined AAP in 2020. She sang the campaign song for AAP, "Bhagat Singh, Kartar Sarabha saare hi ban challe, bhai hun jaago aaiyaan, sarkaar badlan challey, bhai hun jaago aaiyaan". Indian Express called the song a "huge hit during campaigning".

Member of Legislative Assembly
She represents the Kharar Assembly constituency as MLA in Punjab Assembly. Maan won the 2022 Punjab Legislative Assembly election from Kharar on an Aam Aadmi Party ticket. She defeated Ranjit Singh Gill of the Shiromani Akali Dal by 37718 votes. The Aam Aadmi Party gained a strong 79% majority in the sixteenth Punjab Legislative Assembly by winning 92 out of 117 seats in the 2022 Punjab Legislative Assembly election. MP Bhagwant Mann was sworn in as Chief Minister on 16 March 2022.

Committee assignments of Punjab Legislative Assembly 
Member (2022–23) Committee on Public Accounts
Member (2022–23) Committee on Papers laid/to be laid on the table and Library

Cabinet Minister
5 MLAs including Anmol Gagan Maan were inducted into the Punjab cabinet and their swearing in ceremony took place on 4 July 2022. On 5 July, Bhagwant Mann announced the expansion of his cabinet of ministers with five new ministers to the departments of Punjab state government. Anmol Gagan Maan was among the inducted ministers and was given the charge of following departments.

Electoral performance

Discography

Singles
Phullan Wali Gaddi
Gal Chakvi 
Patola (feat. Mixsingh)
Shoukeen Jatt
Kala Sher (feat. Desi Routz)
Sohni
Patandar
Royal Jatti
Jagga (Rang Virse Da)
Jagga
Jatti (feat. Randy J)

Punjabi (album)

References

External links 

Anmol Gagan Maan on Hungama.com

Punjab, India MLAs 2022–2027
Aam Aadmi Party politicians from Punjab, India
Indian women folk singers
Punjabi-language singers
Living people
1990 births